Allegations that Barack Obama spied on Donald Trump are part of a large, sprawling, baseless conspiracy theory posited by the latter, which he described as "the biggest political crime in American history, by far." The series of accusations have been nicknamed Obamagate. Obama had served as President of the United States from 2009 until 2017, when Trump succeeded him; Trump served as president until 2021.

During key points of the 2020 campaign, including the Republican National Convention and both presidential debates, Trump frequently repeated this theory, claiming "they spied on my campaign" in reference to these allegations.

The specific allegations of inappropriate politically motivated surveillance or "spying" all involve the Federal Bureau of Investigation's Crossfire Hurricane investigation of the Trump campaign and transition and their ties to Russia.

Evidence has not been found that surveillance as part of Crossfire Hurricane was at the direction of Obama administration political officials or improper deep state influence, improperly used the Steele dossier, or was designed to surveil the Trump campaign and Trump White House transition team for political purposes.

Specific actions undertaken by the FBI that have been highlighted include the use of informants who had met with Trump advisors including Sam Clovis, George Papadopoulos and Carter Page and obtaining a FISA warrant to legally surveil Carter Page.

The Inspector General report on the Crossfire Hurricane investigation did not find evidence that "political bias or improper motivation influenced the FBI's decision to seek FISA authority on Carter Page", but did point out serious inconsistencies and improper procedures that were followed with regard to the obtaining of the warrants.

Trump has claimed that as part of Crossfire Hurricane, his campaign's phones at Trump Tower were wiretapped. This was refuted by Trump's own Justice Department. In addition, Trump has claimed that conversations of his advisor Michael Flynn with Russian ambassador Sergey Kislyak recorded as part of Crossfire Hurricane were improperly "unmasked." This was also refuted by the Trump Justice Department.

A U.S. Justice Department investigation based on these accusations, led by special counsel John Durham, is continuing and has not yet released a final report.

Background

According to the results of a U.S. Senate investigation, the government of Russia directly and through intermediaries sought influence within 2016 U.S. presidential election candidate Donald Trump's political campaigns and also to sow discord within American society. Thus, actions taken by the then-current Obama Administration in its investigations into these alleged Russian influences provide the bases for claims that it spied on Trump.

Conspiracy theory elements
 Crossfire Hurricane (FBI investigation)
 Deep state in the United States
 Inspector General report on the Crossfire Hurricane investigation
 Robert Mueller's Special Counsel investigation
 Russia investigation origins counter-narrative
 Spygate (conspiracy theory)
 Steele dossier, written by former Mi6 Agent Christopher Steele
 Trump Tower wiretapping allegations
 United States v. Flynn
 Unmasking aides to Donald Trump

Trump campaign figures allegedly spied upon
 Sam Clovis, national co-chair
 Michael Flynn, campaign advisor and future National Security Advisor
 Paul Manafort, campaign manager
 Carter Page, foreign policy advisor
 George Papadopoulos, foreign policy advisor

Obama administration figures allegedly involved
 John Brennan, Director of the Central Intelligence Agency
 James Clapper, Director of National Intelligence
 James Comey, Director of the Federal Bureau of Investigation
 Stefan Halper, FBI Informant
 Bruce Ohr, Justice Department official
 Susan Rice, National Security Advisor
 Peter Strzok, FBI Counterintelligence Division
 Sally Yates, United States Deputy Attorney General
 Unnamed friend of George Papadopoulos, used by the FBI as an informant
 Unnamed U.S. government investigator, used by the FBI as an informant

Investigations launched

Trump administration officials or its allies involved
William Barr, United States Attorney General
Doug Collins, former Ranking Member of the United States House Committee on the Judiciary
John Durham, United States Attorney
Lindsey Graham, Chairman of the United States Senate Committee on the Judiciary
Michael E. Horowitz, United States Department of Justice Office of the Inspector General
Ron Johnson, Chairman of the United States Senate Committee on Homeland Security and Governmental Affairs
Jim Jordan, Ranking Member of the United States House Committee on the Judiciary
Devin Nunes, Ranking Member of the United States House Permanent Select Committee on Intelligence, via the Nunes memo

Timeline

May 2020: Trump allegations
On May 10, 2020—one day after former president Barack Obama criticized the Trump administration's handling of the COVID-19 pandemic—Trump posted a one-word tweet: "OBAMAGATE!" On May 11, Philip Rucker of The Washington Post asked Trump what crime former president Barack Obama committed. Trump's reply was: "Obamagate. It's been going on for a long time ... from before I even got elected and it's a disgrace that it happened.... Some terrible things happened and it should never be allowed to happen in our country again." When Rucker again asked what the crime was, Trump said: "You know what the crime is. The crime is very obvious to everybody. All you have to do is read the newspapers, except yours." On May 15, Trump tweeted that Obamagate was the "greatest political scandal in the history of the United States." This was the third time Trump claimed to be suffering from a scandal of such magnitude, after previously giving Spygate and the Russia investigation similar labels. Also on May 15, Trump linked Obamagate to the "persecution" of Michael Flynn, and a missing 302 form.

Trump called for Congress to summon Obama to testify about "the biggest political crime". Senator Lindsey Graham, chair of the Senate Judiciary Committee, said that he did not expect to summon Obama, but would summon other Obama administration officials. Meanwhile, Attorney General William Barr stated that he did not "expect" Obama to be investigated of a crime. Some of Trump's allies have suggested that the "crime" involved the FBI launching an investigation into incoming national security advisor Michael Flynn, or possibly the "unmasking" by outgoing Obama officials to find out the name of a person who was reported in intelligence briefings to be conversing with the Russian ambassador.

In a May 2020 op-ed at the news website RealClearPolitics, Charles Lipson, professor emeritus of political science at the University of Chicago analyzed the content of "Obamagate". He claimed that the concept refers to three accusations: (1) The Obama administration conducted mass surveillance through the NSA; (2) the Obama administration used surveillance against Trump's 2016 presidential campaign, and (3) the Obama administration did not transfer power seamlessly to the new Trump administration. Lipson further claimed that "these abuses didn’t simply follow each other; their targets, goals, and principal players overlapped. Taken together, they represent some of the gravest violations of constitutional norms and legal protections in American history".

The Associated Press (AP) in May 2020 addressed Obamagate in a fact check, stating that there was "no evidence" of Trump's suggestion that "the disclosure of Flynn's name as part of legal U.S. surveillance of foreign targets was criminal and motivated by partisan politics." AP stated that there is not only "nothing illegal about unmasking," but also that the unmasking of Flynn was approved using the National Security Agency's "standard process." Unmasking is allowed if officials feel that it is needed to understand the collected intelligence. AP further pointed out that the Trump administration was conducting even more unmasking than the Obama administration in the final year of Obama's presidency.

In May, attorney general Bill Barr appointed federal prosecutor John Bash to examine unmasking conducted by the Obama administration.

August 2020: Yates testimony
The concept underlies in part a 2020 U.S. Senate investigation into the 2016–onward FBI's Crossfire Hurricane investigation. Former deputy attorney general Sally Yates on August 5, 2020, testified before the Committee that investigators were concerned that the national security adviser to president elect Trump, Michael Flynn, was conversing in private with the Russian ambassador. According to Yates, Obama was interested in whether Flynn ought to be considered a safe recipient for sensitive briefings and Obama "did not in any way attempt to direct or influence any kind of investigation. Something like that would have set off alarms for me." (According to news reports, a belief that Flynn may have violated the Logan Act – a rarely prosecuted and vague law which constrains individuals from countervailing the existing foreign policy of the United States by way of secretive meetings – that supplied the initial rationale for the FBI to target Flynn.)

September 2020: Accusations of political motives
Accusations have been leveled that Senate Republicans used investigations of "Obamagate" to help provide the Donald Trump 2020 presidential campaign with talking points.

In September, Sen. Ron Johnson, Chairman of the Senate Homeland Security Committee, led Republicans on the committee in securing subpoenas to look into Trump's Obamagate claims. Johnson had received criticism for stating "the more that we expose of the corruption of the transition process between Obama and Trump, the more we expose of the corruption within those agencies, I would think it would certainly help Donald Trump win reelection and certainly be pretty good, I would say, evidence about not voting for Vice President Biden".

October 2020: Trump pushes for arrests
With the news that U.S. Attorney John Durham's investigation into potential abuses within the Obama's administration's handling of the FBI's Crossfire Hurricane investigation would not produce a report or indictments before the 2020 presidential election, President Trump began publicly calling out Attorney General Bill Barr for lack of arrests of major political figures he believes were involved, including his 2020 opponent Joe Biden.

The Washington Post reported on October 13 that Bash's unmasking inquiry had concluded with no findings of substantive wrongdoing and no public report.

On October 25, Trump repeated his allegations in an interview on 60 Minutes, claiming "the biggest scandal was when they spied on my campaign. They spied on my campaign, and they got caught." Host Lesley Stahl challenged the assertion, claiming "there's no real evidence of that. This is 60 Minutes, and we can't put on things we can't verify." Trump disagreed, claiming "they spied on my campaign, and they got caught. And then they went much further than that, and they got caught. And you will see that, Leslie, and you know that, but you just don't want to put it on the air." The dispute was part of a contentious interview that ended with Trump walking out.

December 2020: Durham named special counsel

After the election of Joe Biden as president, Attorney General Bill Barr announced in an interview with the Associated Press on December 1 that he had appointed John Durham as a special counsel to continue his investigation into Trump's allegations of improper political influence on the FBI's surveillance of the Trump campaign.

Because a special counsel can only be fired under limited circumstances, the appointment ensured Durham's investigation would continue into the Biden presidency and not be subject to the usual turnover of U.S. Attorneys as political appointees.

Durham's investigation has continued into 2023, but has not corroborated Trump's claims that Obama or his top staff ordered spying on Trump's campaign.

See also 
 List of conspiracy theories promoted by Donald Trump
 List of "-gate" scandals

References 

Conspiracy theories regarding Barack Obama
Conspiracy theories promoted by Donald Trump
Conspiracy theories in the United States

fr:Obamagate